Páll Ólafsson (1827–1905) was an Icelandic poet and one of the most popular poets of the nation of the 19th century, known for poems about love and about horses.

Many of his poems were made into popular song, such as Lóan er komin and Ó blessuð vertu sumarsól.

References

1827 births
1905 deaths
Pall Olafsson
Pall Olafsson